The 2020–21 season was Al-Ahli's 45th consecutive season in the top flight of Saudi football and 84th year in existence as a football club. The club participated in the Pro League, the King Cup and the AFC Champions League.

The season covered the period from 30 September 2020 to 30 June 2021.

Players

Squad information

Out on loan

Transfers and loans

Transfers in

Loans in

Transfers out

Loans out

Competitions

Overview

Goalscorers

Last Updated: 30 May 2021

Assists

Last Updated: 25 May 2021

Clean sheets

Last Updated: 14 May 2021

References

Al-Ahli Saudi FC seasons
Ahli